The Evangelical Missionary Society of Mayurbhanj (EMSM) was established in 1895 at the instance of Sriram Chandra Bhanj Deo, the then-Maharaja of Mayurbhanj State. It is a registered Non-Government Organisation (NGO) in India. The society is also registered in Australia, and has run the Mayurbhanj Leprosy Home since 1982.

Notes

See also
 Graham Staines
 Persecution of Christians

Evangelicalism in India
Christian missions in India
Christianity in Odisha
Evangelical organizations established in the 19th century
Religious organizations established in 1895
1895 establishments in India